"Recorda Me", which translates to "Remember Me" from Portuguese, is a jazz standard by the saxophonist Joe Henderson. It was introduced on Henderson's debut album Page One, in 1963. This album also featured the first recording of the jazz standard "Blue Bossa", written by trumpeter Kenny Dorham. English lyrics were later written by vocalist Kelley Johnson under the title "Remember Me.'

History
The saxophonist wrote the composition at the age of 15 in a Latin style but later modified it with a bossa nova rhythm. It was recorded by Henderson on subsequent albums, including an uptempo version named "Não Me Esqueça"—"Do Not Forget Me" in Portuguese—on In Pursuit of Blackness and an arrangement named "Recuérdame" (Spanish) on the Big Band album. He recorded live versions on Joe Henderson Quintet at the Lighthouse and in the 1985 film and recording One Night with Blue Note with Freddie Hubbard, Herbie Hancock, Ron Carter and Tony Williams.
The composition is used widely in jazz education programs and jazz songbook compilations.

Musical composition
Recorda Me is a 16-bar AB form written as a bossa nova.
 
 ‖: A–6   | A–6   | A–6   | A–6   | 
 ‖  C–6   | C–6   | C–6   | C–6  F7  ‖ 
 ‖  Bmaj7   | B–7  E7  | Amaj7   | A-7  D7  |
 | Gmaj7   | G-7  C7  | Fmaj7   E79| E79   :‖

Other versions
"Recorda Me" has been covered by many other musicians including:
 Steps Ahead on Smokin' in the Pit (1980)
 McCoy Tyner on New York Reunion (1991)
 Art Farmer on Soul Eyes (1991)
 Greg Osby on New Directions (1991)
 Kelley Johnson on Make Someone Happy (1998)
 Tierney Sutton on Unsung Heroes (2000) 
 Renee Rosnes on Black Narcissus: A Tribute to Joe Henderson (2008)
 Brownman Electryc Trio on Gravitation (2013) - National Jazz Award winner
 Chick Corea Trio on Trilogy (2013)
 Conrad Herwig on The Latin Side of Joe Henderson (2014) 
 Nominated at the 57th Annual Grammy Awards
 Shaun Martin Three-O on Focus (2018)

Notes

See also
List of post-1950 jazz standards

1963 compositions
Bossa nova jazz standards
Hard bop jazz standards
Jazz compositions in A minor
1960s jazz standards
Jazz standards